Jalcomulco is a municipality in Veracruz, Mexico, founded in 1825. It has a land area of 58.40 km2.

The municipality of Jalcomulco is bounded to the north by Emiliano Zapata, to the east by Apazapan, to the south and south-west by Tlaltetela, and to the north-west by Coatepec.

Name
Its name comes from the Nahuatl language. Xalkomolko: Xalli, sand; Komol, Casserole or hole; and ko, in. In the corner of the sand.

Pronounced in Spanish: Halkomulko.

Climate
The weather in Jalcomulco is warm all year with rain in summer and autumn.

Annual precipitation is 1,125 mm.

The average temperature is 24 °C, (75 °F).

Economy
The region principally produces maize, coffee, sugarcane, and mango. It also produces cattle and poultry.

Since the early 1990s ecotourism has been an important part of the economy of the region, with more than a dozen hotels and professional dealers of adventure travel.

Main celebration
In May, a celebration takes place in Jalcomulco to honor San Juan Bautista, the Patron saint of the town.

Sports and activities

The Río de los Pescados section of the Rio Antigua is a whitewater river that flows through the town of Jalcomulco and is commercially rafted.

Other activities to practice in town are rappelling, climbing, hiking, tyrolean crossing, mountain biking, landscape photography, and temazcal.

Filming location
Two-thirds of the scenes of the movie Romancing the Stone (1984) was filmed in this area.

References

External links
  Municipal official webpage
  Municipal official information

Municipalities of Veracruz